Elections for the House of Representatives of the Philippines were held on November 9, 1965. Held on the same day as the presidential election, the party of the incumbent president, Diosdado Macapagal's Liberal Party, won a majority of the seats in the House of Representatives. Despite Ferdinand Marcos of the opposition Nacionalista Party winning the presidential election, Liberal Party congressmen did not defect to the Nacionalista Party. This led to Cornelio Villareal being retained Speaker of the House after retaking it from Daniel Romualdez midway during the previous Congress.

The elected representatives served in the 6th Congress from 1965 to 1969.

Results

See also
6th Congress of the Philippines

References

  

1965
1965 elections in the Philippines